In compressible fluid dynamics, impact pressure (dynamic pressure) is the difference between total pressure (also known as pitot pressure or stagnation pressure) and static pressure.

When input to an airspeed indicator, impact pressure is used to provide a calibrated airspeed reading. An air data computer with inputs of pitot and static pressures is able to provide a Mach number and, if static temperature is known, true airspeed.

Some authors in the field of compressible flows use the term dynamic pressure or compressible dynamic pressure instead of impact pressure.

Isentropic flow
In isentropic flow the ratio of total pressure to static pressure  is given by:

where:
 
 is total pressure

 is static pressure

 is the ratio of specific heats

 is the freestream Mach number

Taking  to be 1.4, and since 

where:

 is dynamic pressure

See also 
 Dynamic pressure
 Pitot-static system
 Pressure
 Static pressure

References

Fluid dynamics